The J.F. Shea Co., Inc. is one of the largest privately held construction and real estate companies in the United States. J.F. Shea comprises a collection of companies including Shea Properties, Shea Homes, Shea Ventures, (Venture Capital), J.F. Shea Construction Inc., the Redding Division, Reed Manufacturing, Trilogy and Bluestar Resort & Golf.

History
J. F. Shea Co., was founded in 1881 in Portland, Oregon by John Francis Shea. The J. F. Shea Company's activities include new-home construction, commercial construction, civil engineering, commercial and multi-family property development and management, construction materials and venture capital. The JF Shea Company's projects include the building of the diversion channels for the Hoover Dam, the foundations for the Golden Gate and Oakland Bay bridges, the tunnels for San Francisco's Bay Area Rapid Transit (BART) system and tunnel work for The Metro Crenshaw/LAX Transit Corridor and the Metro Purple Line Extension.

1920s & 1930s
J.F. Shea Co. constructed the Portland Seawall on the Willamette River. J.F. Shea completes the Mokelumne pipeline, which transported water to Oakland and Berkley. During the 1930s, J.F. Shea built the foundation piers for the Golden Gate Bridge in San Francisco and assisted in the construction of the San Francisco-Oakland Bay Bridge. The company also served as the construction manager for the Hoover Dam.

The outbreak of World War II diverted the attention of nearly all types of businesses, forcing them to respond to the different conditions and demands of a country at war. J.F Shea spent the war years building liberty ships and shipyards.

1960s & 1970s
J.F Shea constructed tunnels and stations for the San Francisco Bay Area Rapid Transit System (BART). The company also managed tunneling efforts for Metro, the subway system in Washington, D.C. In the 1970's, the company formed Shea Properties, which would oversee commercial development, including retail centers, apartments, office buildings and industrial parks.

J.F. Shea Co., Companies
Shea Properties
Trilogy
Shea Mortgage
Shea Homes
Shea Apartment Communities
Venture Capital
J.F. Shea Construction Inc.
Redding
Reed Manufacturing
Blue Star Resort & Golf

References

Real estate companies of the United States
Companies based in Los Angeles County, California
American companies established in 1881
1881 establishments in Oregon